Adelmannsfelden is a municipality in the German state of Baden-Württemberg, in Ostalbkreis district.

Notable people

Franziska von Hohenheim (1748–1811), second wife of Charles Eugene, Duke of Württemberg

References

External links
 

Ostalbkreis
Württemberg